Methylobacterium is a genus of Hyphomicrobiales.

As well as its normal habitats in soil and water, Methylobacterium has also been identified as a contaminant of DNA extraction kit reagents, which may lead to its erroneous appearance in microbiota or metagenomic datasets. In March 2021, a new species, named Methylobacterium ajmalii, associated with three new strains, designated IF7SW-B2T, IIF1SW-B5, and IIF4SW-B5, were reported to have been discovered, for the first time, on the International Space Station.

Natural genetic transformation

Natural genetic transformation in bacteria is a process involving transfer of DNA from one cell to another through the intervening medium, and the integration of the donor sequence into the recipient genome by homologous recombination. Methylobacterium organophilum cells are able to undergo genetic transformation and become competent for DNA uptake near the end of the exponential growth phase.

Species
Methylobacterium comprises the following species:

 Methylobacterium adhaesivum Gallego et al. 2006
 Methylobacterium aerolatum Weon et al. 2008
 Methylobacterium ajmalii Bijlani et al. 2021,

 Methylobacterium aquaticum Gallego et al. 2005
 Methylobacterium brachiatum Kato et al. 2008
 Methylobacterium brachythecii Tani and Sahin 2013
 Methylobacterium bullatum Hoppe et al. 2012
 Methylobacterium cerastii Wellner et al. 2012

 Methylobacterium crusticola Jia et al. 2020
 Methylobacterium currus Park et al. 2018
 Methylobacterium dankookense Lee et al. 2013

 Methylobacterium durans Kim et al. 2020

 Methylobacterium frigidaeris Lee and Jeon 2018
 Methylobacterium fujisawaense Green et al. 1988
 "Methylobacterium funariae" Schauer and Kutschera 2011
 Methylobacterium gnaphalii Tani et al. 2012
 Methylobacterium goesingense Idris et al. 2012
 Methylobacterium gossipiicola Madhaiyan et al. 2012
 Methylobacterium gregans Kato et al. 2008
 Methylobacterium haplocladii Tani and Sahin 2013
 Methylobacterium hispanicum Gallego et al. 2005
 "Methylobacterium indicum" Chaudhry et al. 2016
 Methylobacterium iners Weon et al. 2008
 Methylobacterium isbiliense Gallego et al. 2005
 Methylobacterium jeotgali Aslam et al. 2007
 Methylobacterium komagatae Kato et al. 2008
 Methylobacterium longum Knief et al. 2012

 Methylobacterium marchantiae Schauer et al. 2011
 Methylobacterium mesophilicum (Austin and Goodfellow 1979) Green and Bousfield 1983
 Methylobacterium nodulans Jourand et al. 2004
 Methylobacterium nonmethylotrophicum Feng et al. 2020
 Methylobacterium organophilum Patt et al. 1976 (Approved Lists 1980)
 Methylobacterium oryzae Madhaiyan et al. 2007
 Methylobacterium oryzihabitans Chen et al. 2019
 Methylobacterium oxalidis Tani et al. 2012
 Methylobacterium persicinum Kato et al. 2008
 Methylobacterium phyllosphaerae Madhaiyan et al. 2009
 Methylobacterium phyllostachyos Madhaiyan and Poonguzhali 2014
 "Methylobacterium planium" Jiang et al. 2020
 Methylobacterium platani Kang et al. 2007

 Methylobacterium pseudosasicola Madhaiyan and Poonguzhali 2014

 Methylobacterium radiotolerans corrig. (Ito and Iizuka 1971) Green and Bousfield 1983

 Methylobacterium segetis Ten et al. 2020
 Methylobacterium soli Cao et al. 2013

 Methylobacterium symbioticum Pascual et al. 2021
 Methylobacterium tardum Kato et al. 2008
 Methylobacterium tarhaniae Veyisoglu et al. 2013
 "Methylobacterium terrae" Kim et al. 2019
 Methylobacterium terricola Kim et al. 2020

 Methylobacterium thuringiense Wellner et al. 2013
 Methylobacterium trifolii Wellner et al. 2013
 Methylobacterium variabile Gallego et al. 2005

References

External links
 MicrobeWiki

Hyphomicrobiales
Bacteria genera